Neil Michael Warwick (b 1964) has been Archdeacon of Bristol since September 2019.

Warwick was educated at the University of Nottingham and Ridley Hall, Cambridge. He was ordained in 2006. After a curacy at Towcester he was the incumbent at Earley from 2009 until his appointment as archdeacon.

References

1964 births
Living people
21st-century English Anglican priests
Alumni of the University of Nottingham
Alumni of Ridley Hall, Cambridge
Archdeacons of Bristol